Elisabeth MJ Verpoorte is a professor of microfluidics and miniaturized "lab-on-a-chip" systems in the Faculty of Science and Engineering at the University of Groningen, Netherlands.

Education 
From 1990–1996, Verpoorte trained as an automation systems postdoctoral researcher in the Manz group at CIBA in Basel, Switzerland. She was then a Group Leader with Nico F. de Rooij at the Institute for Microtechnology in Neuchatel. Professor Verpoorte assumed her position in Groningen in 2003.

Research 
Verpoorte's research explores simulating in vivo organismic biology onto microscopic external devices. This is achieved through fabrication and control of chemical detectors and separations modules onto silicon dioxide chips. This dramatically decreases the amount of analyte, solution, or cells required to perform a given analysis. Her specific interests involve electrokinetic control over movement of various substances on these chips.

Volunteer activities 
Verpoorte was the 2018 President for the Society of Laboratory Automation and Screening. She has also held leadership roles in the Dutch Pharmacy Association and multiple international conferences.

References 

Year of birth missing (living people)
Living people
Canadian women engineers
Academic staff of the University of Groningen